The Grammy Award for Best Instrumental Soloist Performance (without orchestra) was awarded from 1959 to 2011. From 1967 to 1971, and in 1987, the award was combined with the award for Best Instrumental Soloist(s) Performance (with orchestra) and awarded as the Grammy Award for Best Classical Performance – Instrumental Soloist or Soloists (with or without orchestra).

The award has had several minor name changes:
 In 1959 the award was known as Best Classical Performance – Instrumentalist (other than concerto-scale accompaniment)
 In 1960 it was awarded as Best Classical Performance – Concerto or Instrumental Soloist (other than full orchestral accompaniment)
 In 1961 it was awarded as Best Classical Performance – Instrumental Soloist or Duo (other than with orchestral accompaniment) 
 From 1962 to 1964 it was awarded as Best Classical Performance – Instrumental Soloist or Duo (without orchestra)
 In 1965 it was awarded as Best Performance – Instrumental Soloist or Soloists (without orchestra)
 From 1966 to 1994 it was awarded as Best Classical Performance – Instrumental Soloist or Soloists (without orchestra) (or a very similar equivalent)
 From 1995 to the present it has been awarded as Best Instrumental Soloist Performance (without orchestra)

In 2012, the award was discontinued in a major overhaul of Grammy categories. The category was merged with the Best Instrumental Soloist(s) Performance (with orchestra) category to form the new Best Classical Instrumental Solo category, similar to the award from 1967 to 1971.

Years reflect the year in which the Grammy Awards were presented, for works released in the previous year.

Recipients

References

Grammy Awards for classical music
Instrumental Soloist Performance (without orchestra)